Waiting for the Rain is a 1985 studio album by South African jazz trumpeter Hugh Masekela. The album features a constellation of local African stars, most notably Bheki Mseleku on tenor saxophone and keyboards, and includes a cover of Fela Kuti's classic song "Lady". The album is dedicated to his mother, Pauline Bowers Masekela. Many tracks from this album were later included in his 2002 live album Live at the BBC.

Track listing

Personnel
Band
Hugh Masekela – lead vocals, flugelhorn, trumpet
Francis Fuster – congas 
Mopati Tsienyane – drums 
Obert Oaki – bass 
John Giblin – bass (track 4) 
David Charles – drums (track 4) 
John Selolwane  – guitar 
Banjo Mosele – rhythm guitar
Tsepo Tshola – lead vocals (track 3) 
Anneline Malebo – lead vocals (track 3) 
Barney Rachabane –  alto saxophone 
Bheki Mseleku – tenor saxophone, keyboards 
Peter Harris – synthesizer 
Thabo Mashishi –  trumpet  (track 5)

Production
Stewart Levine – co-producer 
Anjali Dutt – engineer 
Fiona Macpherson – photography
Anjali Dutt – mixing 
Bryan New – mixing 
James Mtume – mixing

References

External links

1985 albums
Hugh Masekela albums
Albums produced by Stewart Levine